This is a list of Italian films that premiered or were originally released in 1980 (see 1980 in film).

Footnotes

References

 
 
 Shipka, Danny. Perverse Titillation: The Exploitation Cinema of Italy, Spain and France, 1960-1980. McFarland, 2011. .

External links
Italian films of 1980 at the Internet Movie Database

1980
Films
Italian